Superstition is an excessively credulous belief in supernatural causality: the belief that one event is the cause of another without any physical process linking the two, such as astrology, omens, witchcraft, and apotropaic magic. According to Rashid Shaz the whole Muslim world is permeated with pre-Islamic superstitions, which he relates to "clinging to false hope" and even shirk.

According to Travis Zadeh, while various elite Islamic religious factions in various geographical and historical context did contest and probed into beliefs and practices that were assumed to be superstitious, still, Quranic charms, belief in jinn, and visiting tombs of prophets and saints have had a historical hold on general religious people standard in Islamic point of views of salvation. Zadeh says that the belief in jinn and other Muslim occult culture is rooted in the Quran and the culture of early Islamic cosmography. In the same way shrine veneration and acceptance and promotion of saintly miracles has intimate connections to structures of Islamic religious authority and piety in Islamic history. Origins of the deployment of the Quran for protective and curative purposes can be found back to the earliest history of Islamic devotion. According to Michael Muhammad Knight, one community's divinely revealed or empirically observed knowledge would be mere superstition to another community. Knight says, most times religionists interested in demonstrating their rationalism and compatibility with science attempt to dissociate their religions from anything magical, at the same time most pro-science atheist thinkers believe that any attempt at differentiation between religion and magic can be flimsy at best. Knight says that the study of superstitions in Muslim societies raises difficult but important questions for any Islamic revivalist projects, and not only deconstructs between sectarian categories and within themselves too but also challenges the historical stability, coherence and distinctness of Islam as a religion.

Context, background and history 
According to Ali Rahnema, while superstitious ideas may have been equally common among Christians and Muslims until the 16th century AD, in comparison to the Muslim world, the prevalence and intensity among Christians dramatically declined after reformation movements in Europe.

Muslims facing illness or other crises found strength and reassurance in various religious objects and rituals. According to Travis Zadeh, in spite of talismanic use of the Quran in charms and amulets, tomb visitation evoked much censure in certain orthodox circles. Still in urban centers of the Muslim world, of the pre-modern era active culture of shrine visitation used to be too common. As such both orthodox and folk popular domains of Islamic religious performance build on the power of baraka (divine blessing or charisma) derived through sacred matter. So, various expressions of Quranic theurgy, from charms and amulets to inscriptions on bowls and garments are as much pervasive, converging with ancient attitudes toward divine language and sacred writing.

According to Christiane Gruber, Islamic tradition regards water as having healing properties and associates it with cleanliness and godliness. The Quran says water is the source of "every living thing". Since the seventh century, Muslim pilgrims have visited the Zamzam Well, believing its water to be curative, and using it in cleaning rituals and prayer. From the 11th century until around the 19th century, Muslim cultures used magic bowls, healing necklaces and other objects like amulets, talismanic shirt, and scrolls in hopes of warding off drought, famine, floods and even epidemic diseases. Anti-plague talismans known as the "Garden of Names", Quranic scrolls and amulets were worn around the neck or otherwise attached to the body, believing that physical contact with the object would unlock the enclosed blessings or life force, known as baraka in Arabic. According to Zadeh, the same is true about magic in its various manifestations, which explains a good deal about how the bounds of the licit and the illicit have historically been defined and negotiated. In the modern period, Muslim societies, faced with varied discourses of demystification, the domains of the magical and the enchanted went through substantial reconfiguration in the expressions of Islamic piety, devotion, and learning. Zadeh says the process of modernization in Muslim world, with its grounding in European colonialism and post-Enlightenment thought, as well as in Islamic reformism, has contested and reconfigured many historical and traditional practices, often viewed them as being ignorance and superstitious. This can be observed, for example, rather notably in critiques or corrective advice literature propagated by a range of Muslim scholars toward such activities as exorcism, shrine devotion, and the preparation of amulets, most of such discourse is rooted in classical Islamic exegesis; but, they take on profoundly different expressions in the context of modern Islamic reform. In the competing views of normativity, magic, marvel, and miracle ultimately takes role of normative categories designed not only to understand the world but also to shape it.

Nazar (amulet) and taʿwīdh 

The taʿwiz or taʿwīdh is an amulet or locket usually containing verses from the Quran or other Islamic prayers and symbols pertaining to magic. The Tawiz is worn by some Muslims to protect them from evil.

The amulet called nazar is supposed to protect against the evil eye, a superstition shared among several cultures including Muslim ones.

Occultism 

Ulum al-ghariba ("occult sciences") or Ulum al-hafiya ("secret sciences") refers to occultism in Islam. Occultism in Islam includes various practices like talismans and interpreting dreams. Simiyya is a doctrine found commonly within Sufi-occult traditions that may be deduced upon the notion of "linking the superior natures with the inferior...", and broadly described as theurgy.

Sufism 

According to Owen Davies Sufis remained at receiving end from orthodox and modernist for some of their perceived superstitious practices from both opposite end of reformists, not only that Sufis got persecuted too for their variant belief systems. According to J.D.Kila there are multiple extreme instances of attempts to erase Sufi identity mixed with iconoclasm, considering the same to be idolatrous, like desecration and destruction of Sufi places of worship and cultural heritage, banning Sufi singing and dancing and cultural festivals, for example to disprove an un-Islamic superstition a sacred door of Sidi Yahya Mosque was forcefully destroyed since people believed that door supposedly not to be opened till end of the world.

Devils, Ghoul and Jinn 

In Arabic folklore, the ghul is said to dwell in cemeteries and other uninhabited places. A male ghoul is referred to as ghul while the female is called ghulah. While analyzing beliefs in unseen and supernatural angels like Munkar and Nakir visits to tombs in Islamic eschatology, John MacDonald says that origination of such ideas is likely to be then contemporary folklore or superstition. When Islam spread outside of Arabia, belief in the jinn was assimilated with local belief about spirits and deities from Iran, Africa, Turkey and India.

Since the jinn, unlike many spirits and demons in other religions, are thought to be physical beings, Muslims adhere to superstitious practices like uttering dastur before throwing hot water or urinating, warning jinn to leave the place so as to not feel offended by humans.

Due to their physical presence, Islamic scholars debated about legal issues of marriage between jinn and humans, leading to a far reaching belief in sexual union between supernatural creatures and humans. Shayāṭīn (devils), are another type of supernatural creature, deriving from Judeo-Christian demons. According to the Quran they frequently assault heaven but are warded off by angels throwing meteors on them, therefore some Muslims curse the shayatin when seeing a shooting star, believing it was thrown at a shaitan.

Exorcism 

Exorcism in Islam is called ʿazaʿim. Ruqya on the other hand summons jinn and demons by invoking the names of God, and to command them to abandon their mischief and is thought to repair damage believed caused by jinn possession, witchcraft (sihr) or the evil eye. Exorcisms today are part of a wider body of contemporary Islamic alternative medicine.

Morocco has many possession traditions, including exorcism rituals.

Magic 

Islam distinguishes between God-given gifts or good magic and black magic. Good supernatural powers are therefore a special gift from God, whereas black magic is achieved through help of jinn and shayatin. In the Quranic narrative, Sulayman (Solomon) had the power to speak with animals and command jinn, and he thanks God for this نعمة (i.e. gift, privilege, favour, bounty), which is only given to him with God's permission.

Karamat 

Miracles in Islam play less of an evidentiary role. The Quran is considered the main miracle of the Prophet Muhammad, though the Quran mentions miracles like Jesus talking in infancy. In Sunni Islam, karamat refers to supernatural wonders performed by Muslim saints. In the technical vocabulary of Islamic religious sciences, the singular form karama has a sense similar to charism, a favor or spiritual gift freely bestowed by God. The marvels ascribed to Muslim saints have included supernatural physical actions, predictions of the future, and "interpretation of the secrets of hearts". A wide-spread belief holds that even ordinary humans can become saints and endowed by God with supernatural powers. Such saints played a significant role in missionary activities (dawah).

Asia

Iran

It is claimed by some experts that first minerals, fruits, mountains and seas that accepted Islam, Prophet Mohammed and Shia Imam Ali Velayat include eggplant, gold, fresh water oceans, mount agate. Persian melon is said to not have accepted Velayat by prophet's quote according to Mohammad-Baqer Majlesi
. After the death of Abbas the Great his burial place was not designated prior to avoid Talisman. Dogs are called Najis.

Natural phenomena 

While Solar eclipse and Lunar eclipses, Earthquakes, Thunder and lightning are just natural phenomena as per modern scientific explanations; and Islam too largely avoids irrational connections of the same with other coincidences in human life, still some Muslim individuals and communities are seen singling out specific natural objects and events as signs of God and special sign prayers (salat al-Ayat) are observed on occasions like Solar eclipse and Lunar eclipses, Earthquakes, Thunder and lightning.

Bangladesh 
Ummy Salma Munni et al. 2017 study aimed to understand the existing beliefs and practices related to food intake among Bangladeshi diabetic pregnant mothers found that 43% of mothers believed that food should not be taken during the call to prayer and 91% of them practiced it. Regarding similar beliefs about eclipse times, the percentage of belief was much higher (80%) and 90% practiced it. With varying proportion for particular fishes, 44–58% surveyed believed that some fishes need to be avoided due to the increased movement of child, fetal malformation and disease and 93% actually practiced it. Twenty-eight percent had negative beliefs about duck meat, 78% about pineapple and 8% about coconut. The respective percentages for practice were 82%, 99% and 50% correspondingly. Mentally and physically abnormal children, different kinds of child illness and threat of abortion were among the reasons attributed for misbeliefs about those foods.

Ummy Salma Munni et al. study suggests that pregnant mothers with diabetes, specially in developing countries, are particularly prone to suffer from dietary imbalances due to practices involving superstitions and irrational beliefs.

India and Pakistan 

Among Muslims in India and Pakistan, magical thinking pervades as many acts and events are attributed to supernatural and ritual, such as prayer, sacrifice, or the observance of a taboo are followed. The penchant for faith healers and black magicians spans society, from the rich landlords of the rural areas to the urban classes of Hyderabad Deccan, Bangalore, Lahore and Karachi. In India and Pakistan, mental illness and psychological problems are often considered to be an encounter with Shaitan (Satan), evil jinn or demons who have taken over one's body and mind. People, especially children and young girls, wear taʿwiz (amulets) to ward off the evil eye. Spells, incantations and curses could also result in ghouls or churel haunting a person.

Muslim holy persons (Imams, Maulvis, Sufis, Mullahs, Faqirs) perform exorcism on individuals who are believed to be possessed. The homes, houses, buildings and grounds are blessed and consecrated by Mullahs or Imams by reciting Quran and Adhan, the Islamic call to prayer, recited by the muezzin. Some of the popular superstitions in India and Pakistan included that black cats crossing one's path will bring bad luck, a crow's cawing announces the surprise arrival of guests, consuming dairy products with seafood will cause skin diseases, itchy palms means presage monetary gains, resting under trees after dark carries the risk of demonic possession, twitching of the left eye is an ill-omen, and sneezing can be caused by being in another's thoughts.

Islamic responses

Flexible modernist discourse 
According to Daniel W. Brown a whole genre of devout literature exists to ascribe miraculous proofs of Muhammad's prophesy, shaped with the purpose of establishing Muhammad's prophetic credentials, many traditional scholars like Ibn Ishaq described various miracles, like a palm tree sighs as prophet passes, at prophet's command a cluster of dates jumps off the tree, the moon is split down the middle, with very small amount of food the prophet feeds the crowd. Brown says to remain sensitive discomfiture of modern audiences such descriptions of miracles are systematically expunged and hence modern audiences grown with sanitized accounts of the prophet get startled with pervasiveness of miracles in early biographies of Muhammad. According to Brown many modern Muslims and non Muslims may agree that probably, Muhammad would not have performed any miracles, and view such miracles as a relic of superstitions, and hence why many modern Muslims may wish the miracle accounts to disappear since Quran itself implies that Muhammad did not perform any miracles.

Influenced by Al-Afghani's modernist interpretations, Muhammad Abduh, a mufti of Egypt revisited then contemporary Islamic thought with his ijtihad post–1899 AD in his tafsir al Manar, expressed that, wherever the Quran seemed contradictory and irrational to logic and science, it must be understood as reflecting the Arab vision of the world, as written with available 7th century intellectual level of Arabs; all verses referring to superstitions like witchcraft and the evil eye be explained as expressions of then–Arab beliefs; and miraculous events and deeds in Quran be rationally explained just as metaphors or allegories.

In their research paper, Jafar Nekoonam, Fatemeh Sadat, and Moosavi Harami discuss the verity of interpretations about the Quranic concept dealt in verses 15:16-18, 37:6-10, 72:8-9, 67:5 of stone throwing devils with meteors. According to Jafar Nekoonam et al, 2016, various interpretations for what the Quran means by stone throwing devils with meteors have been put forward by Muslim exegetes over the centuries. In the pre-modern times, the meaning of this Quranic expression was assumed to be clear, Meccan unbelievers would accuse the Prophet of getting the revelation from the jinn. According to Jafar Nekoonam et al, the Quran responded to their allegations by saying that jinn had no access to the heavenly discourse, as the heavens were protected with meteors. But since, in the modern times, scientific community has denied any relation in between meteors and devils and meteors being simply stones that are scattered across the universe, burning and transforming into fire after entering the earth's atmosphere. The way the interpreters of the Quran understood the verses in question has been changed with the modern era scientific developments.

According to Jafar Nekoonam et al, some commentators considered the idea of stone throwing devils with meteors in relation to the immaterial world, presumed beyond human understanding; hence, they would refrain from interpreting it. But according to Jafar Nekoonam et al, such attitude does not explain how mentioning an incomprehensible idea would have functioned as a response to the accusations of Meccan disbelievers of the time of the Prophet. Other interpreters say that it is possible that the meteors actually force away the jinn from the abode of angels, but this theory would not be acceptable either, since angels are not material beings to live in the material sky. Some other scholars suggested non-literal interpretations for these verses. They assumed that these Quranic verses did not refer to material meteors or heavens, but referred to just the fact that jinn were not allowed to enter God's throne. Jafar Nekoonam et al says such interpretation would mean that during the first fourteen centuries of Islam, the verses of the Quran were misunderstood, which would not be in line with the fact that the Quran is the guide for all mankind of all times. Based on this analysis, Jafar Nekoonam et al concludes that the right interpretation would be to say that the Quran employs the idea of stone throwing devils with meteors, which was familiar to its original audience, in order to reject the accusation by Meccan unbelievers that the Prophet received the revelation from devils. Interpreting the Quran to say in fact states in the form of that familiar idea, is that devils are supposed to be incapable of ascending to the spiritual world of angels to receive heavenly guidance. Thus, in this theory, such interpretation, both the literal meaning of the verses in question, which was what Muslim understanding in the past fourteen centuries, and the purity of the Quran from unscientific claims can be preserved.

See also 

 Astrology in medieval Islam
 Christian mythology
 Criticism of Islam
 Great Book of Interpretation of Dreams
 Iconophobia
 
 Islamic attitudes towards science
 Islamic view of miracles
 Isra and Mi'raj
 Jewish mythology
 Miracles of Muhammad
  Payman
 Predestination in Islam
 Psychology of religion and dreams#Islam
 Quran and miracles
 Quranic literalism
 Quranic inerrancy
 Religious skepticism
 Splitting of the moon
 Superstition in Judaism
 Magic and religion
 Religion#Superstition
 Superstition#Superstition and religion
 Superstition in Turkey
 Shams al-Ma'arif

References

Bibliography

In popular culture 

 Muzaffar, Ayesha. Abu's Jinns.  Amazon Digital Services LLC - KDP Print US, 2018.

Superstitions
Islamic mythology